Group 7 consisted of three of the 32 teams entered into the European zone: Czechoslovakia, Scotland, and Wales. These three teams competed on a home-and-away basis for one of the 8.5 spots in the final tournament allocated to the European zone. The spot would be assigned to the group's winner.

Standings

Matches

Notes

External links 
Group 7 Detailed Results at RSSSF

7
1976–77 in Czechoslovak football
1977–78 in Czechoslovak football
1976–77 in Scottish football
1977–78 in Scottish football
1976–77 in Welsh football
1977–78 in Welsh football